Ice Lake is a small freshwater lake at  on the south skirt of the Hurwal Divide within the Eagle Cap Wilderness region in Wallowa County, in northeastern Oregon, United States. Ice Lake is the traditional base camp for hikers climbing the Matterhorn, one of the Wallowa Mountains.

See also
 List of lakes in Oregon

References 

Lakes of Oregon
Eagle Cap Wilderness